Brushford is a village and civil parish in the Mid Devon district of Devon in England.  According to the 2001 census it had a population of 59.  The village is situated on the River Taw, and is about 12 miles north-east of Okehampton.

The church has a Norman Doorway, 16th century screen and Jacobean Pulpit.
Brushford at GENUKI
Brushford community page

External links

Villages in Devon